Niglaradon is an extinct genus of mountain beaver in the family Aplodontiidae, found from Idaho to South Dakota during the Oligocene.

References

Extinct rodents